Luca Attanasio, the Italian ambassador to the Democratic Republic of the Congo, was killed on 22 February 2021 along with two other people when a World Food Programme (WFP) delegation travelling on a field visit was attacked by armed individuals. The two-vehicle convoy with seven people was travelling in the Congolese province of North Kivu, from the province's capital of Goma to a WFP school feeding programme in Rutshuru, a town 70 kilometres north of Goma, on a route that would have taken the vehicles through Virunga National Park. The attack occurred at 10:15 a.m. local time near the townships of Kibumba and Kanyamahoro. The WFP and North Kivu governor Carly Nzanzu said the convoy did not have a security escort at the time of the attack.

Attack
The convoy carrying Attanasio was travelling on a stretch of National Route 2 in the Virunga National Park when it was stopped by armed gunmen. The attackers killed one person at the scene, identified as Congolese United Nations driver Mustapha Milambo. The other members of the delegation were led into the bush by the armed assailants where an exchange of gunfire ensued. In the exchange of gunfire, Attanasio and his bodyguard, 30-year-old carabiniere Vittorio Iacovacci, were mortally wounded. Others travelling in the convoy were also injured. Attanasio was shot in the abdomen and succumbed to his injuries before arriving at a hospital in Goma. According to prosecutor Alberto Pioletti, autopsies showed that Attanasio and Iacovacci were killed in a shootout rather than by execution-style murder.

International responses
The bodies of Attanasio and Iacovacci were repatriated to Italy via military aircraft, and were met by Prime Minister Mario Draghi in a  small ceremony on the tarmac. Draghi asked the United Nations and the World Food Programme to open an investigation into the attack. President of the Democratic Republic of the Congo Félix Tshisekedi sent a letter to Attanasio's widow Zakia Seddiki, saying his government had started an investigation in Goma "so that light is shed on these heinous crimes as soon as possible." Italian Minister of Foreign Affairs Luigi Di Maio said "the circumstances of this brutal attack are still unclear and no effort will be spared to shed light on what happened." A group of Italian investigators went to Goma in coordination with a prosecutorial investigation that started in Rome. Several Italian newspapers ran front-page tributes to those who were killed; Turin-based La Stampa ran the headline "Luca and Vittorio. The best of Italy." Pope Francis expressed his sorrow "for the disappearance of these servants of peace and law." Congolese authorities accused the Democratic Forces for the Liberation of Rwanda of the killing; they denied responsibility and condemned the attack.

Arrests 
On 19 January 2022, police in the DRC announced they had arrested six members of a highway robbers' gang suspected of killing Attanasio.

Murder of Mwilanya Asani William
On 5 March 2021, Mwilanya Asani William, the attorney who was investigating the deaths of the three men, was murdered by unknown gunmen during an ambush.

References

2020s in the United Nations
2021 mass shootings in Africa
2021 murders in the Democratic Republic of the Congo
Ambushes in Africa
Attacks on diplomatic missions
Deaths by firearm in the Democratic Republic of the Congo
Deaths by person in Africa
Democratic Republic of the Congo–Italy relations
Diplomatic incidents
February 2021 crimes in Africa
Foreign relations of Italy
Italy and the United Nations
Kidnapping in the 2020s
Kidnapping in Africa
North Kivu
People murdered in the Democratic Republic of the Congo
Terrorist incidents in Africa in 2021
Terrorist incidents in the Democratic Republic of the Congo
Terrorist incidents involving vehicular attacks
Unsolved murders in Africa